Zviadists was an informal name (often used pejoratively by political opponents) of supporters of the former Georgian President Zviad Gamsakhurdia, who was overthrown and killed during the Georgian Civil War of 1991–1993.

President Zviad Gamsakhurdia was ousted in a bloody coup that destroyed the center of Tbilisi between 20 December 1991 and 6 January 1992. Zviad Gamsakhurdia's supporters, the Zviadists staged mass demonstrations against the post-coup government led by the former Communist leader Eduard Shevardnadze in various parts of Georgia and organized armed groups which prevented the government forces from taking control of Samegrelo, the ex-President's home province. Skirmishes between pro- and anti-Gamsakhurdia forces lasted throughout 1992 and 1993 and developed into a full-scale civil war with Gamsakhurdia's return to Western Georgia in September 1993. Zviadist rebels were defeated and Gamsakhurdia was probably murdered on 31 December 1993.

Gamsakhurdia's body was recovered and his death was confirmed on 15 February 1994.

After Gamsakhurdia's death, the Zviadists never created a single party, but joined various political organizations and social movements, while some of them continued to fight Eduard Shevardnadze's government.

See also
Round Table—Free Georgia

References 
 Jonathan Wheatley (2005), Georgia from National Awakening to Rose Revolution: delayed transition in the former Soviet Union. Ashgate Publishing, Ltd., .

Political history of Georgia (country)
1990s in Georgia (country)